The 1989 Asian Badminton Championships was the 9th edition of Badminton Asia Championships. It took place from December 18 to December 23, 1993 in Shanghai, China. Only the team competition for men's teams was held. Chinese Men's team won the crown.

Medalists

Semifinals

China vs South Korea

Malaysia vs Indonesia

Final

China vs Indonesia

References

External links 

Badminton Asia Championships
Asian Badminton Championships
1989 Asian Badminton Championships
Badminton Asia Championships
Badminton Asia Championships